Lichfield Museum, formerly known as "Lichfield Heritage Centre", is dedicated to the history and heritage of the city of Lichfield. The museum is located on the south side of the market square on the second floor of St Mary's Church in the centre of Lichfield, Staffordshire in the United Kingdom. Following the renovation of St. Mary's Church into a new community hub in 2018, the museum no longer exists.

The museum was opened by the Earl of Lichfield on 30 May 1981 when the 19th century city centre church was converted into a multi-purpose building to serve the community. The newly formed second floor of the church was dedicated to a museum and heritage exhibition dedicated to the history of Lichfield. The museum is run mainly by volunteers and is an independent Registered Charity and financially self-supporting.

Features and exhibitions

The museum features a treasury exhibition, were can be seen chalices, goblets and centrepieces from the city, Diocese of Lichfield and The Staffordshire Regiment. Also viewable is the Lichfield Heritage Collection which features over 6000 photographs; negatives; newspapers; reports; leaflets and other interesting memorabilia from the past 150 years. There is a muniment room which features some of the oldest objects in the collection including  the City's ancient charters, the earliest being Queen Mary`s Charter of 1553 followed by several others over the centuries, right up to Elizabeth II. The Guild Book of St Mary's Guild of 1387 - 1680 is the oldest document exhibited. There are also two audio-visual presentations which feature stories into Lichfield's ancient past, the building of the Cathedral and the sieges during the Civil War.

The Staffordshire Millennium Embroideries are a unique representation of a thousand years of Staffordshire's history, embroidered in silk, wool, cotton, metallic thread and leather, one panel for each century of the Millennium. This inspired work was created solely by Mrs Sylvia Everitt of Rawnsley, near Cannock, who made these embroideries over five years of dedicated work as her gift to the people of Staffordshire in commemoration of the Millennium. She toured the county for several years giving lectures about her embroideries before donating them to the Lichfield Museum where they are now permanently displayed in a specially designed Gallery. For her work Sylvia was awarded the MBE in 2002.

Tours are available to the top of St Mary's 158-year-old spire to a viewing platform 40m above the market square with views over the city and surrounding countryside. There is a coffee shop and gift shop on the ground floor at the exit of the museum. The museum is open 7 days a week from 09:30 until 16:00.

References

External links
Lichfield Museum - St. Mary's Lichfield
Visit Britain Tourism website

Buildings and structures in Lichfield
Museums in Staffordshire
Local museums in Staffordshire
Museums established in 1981
1981 establishments in England